Robert F. Munroe Day School is a K-12 private school in Gadsden County, Florida, which was opened as a segregation academy in 1970.

History
As in many public school districts in the Southern United States, Gadsden County officials delayed their compliance with the U.S. Supreme Court's 1954 order to end segregation in public schools. In 1965, the first Black students began attending previously all-white schools in county schools. That same year, groups of white parents began organizing private schools, dubbed segregation academies, to keep their children from being educated alongside black students. One such group came together in 1968; the following year, the board incorporated a non-profit organization to launch what was to be called Gadsden Day School. Founding board member Robert Fraser Munroe died before the school opened its doors, and the remaining members renamed their segregation academy to honor his work in creating it.

In 1970, the school began operations with grades 1 through 12 under headmaster S.M. Eubanks. The day kindergarten Quincy campus opened in 1977.

Campuses
The main campus is in Mount Pleasant, an unincorporated area near Quincy, while the kindergarten campus, the Robert F. Munroe Day Kindergarten, is in Quincy proper.

The main campus has  of land. Buildings on the Mount Pleasant campus include:
 Bates Science Building (1981). Named for George Davis Bates, Jr. and Mortimer Boulware Bates.
 Billy Don Grant Student Center (1990). Named for a donor.
 Angus T. Hinson Elementary Science Lab & Maker's Space (2019).
 Carolyn Brinson May Auditorium. Remodeled and renamed in 2005.
 Mary Gray Munroe Library  (1983). Named for the mother of the school's namesake.
 Byron and Isabel Suber Complex (1971). School gymnasium remodeled and renamed in 1998.
 VanLandingham & Mahaffey Building (1997). Holds classrooms for grades 1 and 2; named for Jimmy Mahaffey and Hall VanLandingham.
 Julia Munroe Woodward Elementary Building (1997). Holds classrooms for grades 3-5

The Quincy kindergarten campus includes the John Allen Blitch Child Development Center (1987).

References

High schools in Gadsden County, Florida
Schools in Gadsden County, Florida
Private K-12 schools in Florida
1969 establishments in Florida
Segregation academies in Florida
Educational institutions established in 1969